Clocinizine is a first-generation antihistamine of the diphenylmethylpiperazine class. It is marketed in Spain in combination with phenylpropanolamine under the brand name Senioral.

Synthesis

The reduction of 4-Chlorobenzophenone [134-85-0] (1) with NBH gives 4-Chlorobenzhydrol [119-56-2] (2). Halogenation of the alcohol in muriatic acid afforded 4-Chlorobenzhydryl chloride [134-83-8] (3). Alkylation with one equivalent of piperazine gives 1-(4-Chlorobenzhydryl)piperazine [303-26-4] (4). Alkylation of the remaining nitrogen with Cinnamyl Bromide [4392-24-9] (5) completed the synthesis of Clocinizine (6).

References

Chlorcyclizines
H1 receptor antagonists